Esponsorama Racing is a motorcycle racing team competing in the MotoE World Championship under the name Avintia Esponsorama Racing.

The team was established in 1994 by Raúl Romero and Josep Oliva as By Queroseno Racing, also known as Team BQR. In 2012 the team changed its name to Avintia Racing, following an alliance between BQR and the Grupo Avintia. In 2020 the team rebranded itself as Esponsorama Racing, in line with their registered company name, though Grupo Avintia remained as a main sponsor.

History

Domestic racing
Team BQR started competing in the Spanish road racing championship (Campeonato de España de Velocidad). Between 2005 and 2008 the team won three Fórmula Extreme titles with José David de Gea and two 125GP class titles with Stefan Bradl and Efrén Vázquez.

Grand Prix racing

125 and 250 cc classes
After many World Championship wildcard appearances, BQR became a full entry in the 2001 season using Honda bikes in the 250 cc class. In 2007 the team switched to Aprilia machinery. BQR won its first World Championship race with Scott Redding riding an Aprilia 125 at the 2008 British Grand Prix.

Moto2
The team unveiled the first Moto2 bike in February 2009 and fielded a prototype in the 2009 Spanish Road Racing Championship. In 2010, they participated in the new Moto2 World Championship, with Yonny Hernández and Mashel Al Naimi as riders. The team continued in Moto2 until the conclusion of the 2013 season. In 2018, the team made a significant number of wildcard entries with rider Xavi Cardelús.

MotoGP
In  the team debuted in the MotoGP class as a Claiming Rule Team using both FTR Moto and Inmotec frames badged as BQR, powered by Kawasaki engines. The riders were Iván Silva and Yonny Hernández. In  Avintia entered the MotoGP class with Kawasaki-engined FTR frames, fielding two bikes for Hiroshi Aoyama and Héctor Barberá.

For the  season Aoyama was replaced by Mike Di Meglio and the team fielded a new bike badged as the Avintia GP14, reportedly based on the 2007-2009 Kawasaki Ninja ZX-RR with some input from Kawasaki. Following a mid-season agreement between Avintia and Ducati, Barberá received an Open-specification Ducati Desmosedici for the last five rounds.

In  the team entered two Open class Desmosedici GP14 motorcycles, for Barberá and Di Meglio. For  Di Meglio was replaced by Loris Baz. In  the team changed its name to Reale Esponsorama Racing.

In 2018, two bikes were fielded for Tito Rabat and Xavier Siméon. Former rider Rubén Xaus joined the team as Siméon's coach.  At the British Grand Prix, Rabat's major crash with Franco Morbidelli at Stowe corner was a contributing factor in the decision to cancel the race due to unsafe conditions. As a result of the triple fracture he sustained to his right leg, Rabat missed the remaining 7 races of the 2018 season, and was replaced by Christophe Ponsson and Jordi Torres. For 2019, Rabat returned and was partnered by Czech rider Karel Abraham.

In 2020 the team now known as Esponsorama Racing retained Tito Rabat, this time paired with KTM factory exile Johann Zarco. They also received a factory-support from Ducati - with the one-year old Desmosedici-spec bikes - because of the direct contract from Ducati for Zarco. For 2021, 2020 Moto2 World Champion Enea Bastianini and Luca Marini joined the team. They will both ride a 2019 Ducati Desmosedici - the same specification that Zarco used in 2020. However, they will have the different liveries from their bike as Marini will be using the Sky Racing Team VR46 liveries into his bike.

Moto3 
In 2017 Avintia debuted in the Moto3 class entering a KTM for Vicente Pérez in two races as a wildcard. For 2018 the team entered a single full-season entry, beginning the season with Livio Loi for the first seven rounds and replacing him with Pérez for the remainder of the season. In 2019 the team began with Pérez for the first seven rounds, but replacing him with Stefano Nepa for the remaining races, and addition to a number of wildcard entries for Nepa, Meikon Kawakami, and Carlos Tatay. In 2020, Avintia entered reigning Red Bull Rookies champion Tatay as their sole full-season entry in the class.

MotoE 
As a satellite team in MotoGP, Avintia was given an entry in the inaugural MotoE World Cup in 2019. The team achieved two wins with Eric Granado and two podiums with their former MotoGP rider Xavier Siméon, good for third and sixth place in the championship, respectively. For the 2020 season, the team retained Granado and partnered him with their former Moto2 rider, Andorran Xavier Cardelús.

Results

Notes
* Season still in progress.

MotoGP results
(key) (Races in bold indicate pole position; races in italics indicate fastest lap)

Notes
* Season still in progress.

References

External links
 

Motorcycle racing teams
Motorcycle racing teams established in 1994
1994 establishments in Spain